Koidu is a city in Sierra Leone.

Koidu may also refer to one of several villages in Estonia:
Koidu, Harju County, village in Saue Parish, Harju County
Koidu, Lääne County, village in Ridala Parish, Lääne County
Koidu, Saare County, village in Kaarma Parish, Saare County
Koidu, Viljandi County, village in Tarvastu Parish, Viljandi County

See also
Koidu-Ellavere, village in Koeru Parish, Järva County, Estonia